Grand River is a small town in the Canadian province of Nova Scotia, located in Richmond County. Its geographical coordinates are 45° 38' 0" North, 60° 40' 0" West

Points of interest
Point Michaud Beach House
Point Michaud Beach Provincial Park
Salmon View Log Cabins

References

Grand River on Destination Nova Scotia

Communities in Richmond County, Nova Scotia
General Service Areas in Nova Scotia